Violin Concerto No. 3 may refer to any composer's third violin concerto:

Violin Concerto No. 3 (Bruch) in D minor
Violin Concerto No. 3 (Haydn) in A major
Violin Concerto No. 3 (Mozart) in G major
Violin Concerto No. 3 (Paganini) in E major
Violin Concerto No. 3 (Saint-Saëns) in B minor
Violin Concerto No. 3 (Thomas), Juggler in Paradise
Violin Concerto No. 3 (Vieuxtemps) in A major, by Henri Vieuxtemps

See also 
 Violin concerto
 List of compositions for violin and orchestra